Marianne is a census-designated place located in Paint Township and Elk Township, Clarion County, in the U.S. state of Pennsylvania. As of the 2010 census the population of Marianne was 1,167.

Demographics

References

External links

Census-designated places in Clarion County, Pennsylvania